French singer Patricia Kaas has released ten studio albums, seven live albums, three compilation albums, and fifty-three singles. Kaas' first hit, "Mademoiselle chante le blues" was released in November 1987. It peaked at number seven on the French Singles Chart in January 1988 and was certified Silver. The next single, "D'Allemagne" was issued in May 1988 and reached number eleven in July 1988. Both songs were included on Kaas' debut album, Mademoiselle chante... released in November 1988. The album peaked at number two in France in February 1989 and stayed on the chart until 1991. Mademoiselle chante... was certified Diamond in France and has sold 1.6 million copies in this country alone. It was also certified 2× Platinum in Switzerland and Gold in Canada. The album also peaked at number thirteen on the European Top 100 Albums chart. The third single, "Mon mec à moi" was issued in November 1988 and reached number five in France in February 1989. It was also certified Silver. Released as the next single in May 1989, "Elle voulait jouer cabaret" peaked at number seventeen in France in June 1989. The last single, "Quand Jimmy dit" was issued in October 1989. It reached number ten in France the next month and was also certified Silver.

The second album, Scène de vie was released on 9 April 1990. It topped the chart in France for ten consecutive weeks and was certified Diamond after selling over 1.3 million copies there. Scène de vie also reached number fifteen in Switzerland, number eighteen in Germany and number twenty on the European Top 100 Albums. It was also certified 2× Platinum in Switzerland, Platinum in Canada and Gold in Germany. The album also entered the Billboards World Albums chart, and peaked at number seven there. Scène de vie included four top forty singles: "Les hommes qui passent" (number seven), "Les mannequins d'osier" (number twenty-one), "Kennedy Rose" (number thirty-six) and "Regarde les riches" (number twenty-seven). It was followed by a live album, Carnets de scène which was issued in November 1991. Carnets de scène peaked at number eight in France and was certified 2× Gold.

The third studio album, Je te dis vous was released on 6 April 1993. It became Kaas' second number-one album in France. Je te dis vous debuted at the top of the chart and stayed there for five consecutive weeks. It has sold over 1.4 million copies in France and became Kaas' third Diamond album there. Je te dis vous also peaked at number two in Switzerland, number ten on the European Top 100 Albums and number eleven in Germany, and was certified 2× Platinum in Switzerland, Platinum in Finland, and Gold in Canada and Germany. Various singles were released to promote the album, including the most successful "Il me dit que je suis belle" (number five in France; Silver certification), and also "Entrer dans la lumière" (number fifteen in France), "Ceux qui n'ont rien" and "Reste sur moi" (number twenty-six on the US Dance Club Songs). The second live album, Tour de charme was issued  in November 1994, reaching number fourteen in France nad being certified Platinum.

Dans ma chair, the next studio album was released on 18 March 1997. It topped the chart in Belgium Wallonia and reached number two in France, number five in Switzerland, number eight in Finland, number eleven on the European Top 100 Albums and number sixteen in Germany. It was certified 2× Platinum in France, Platinum in Belgium and Switzerland, and Gold in Finland. It was also awarded with Platinum certification by the IFPI for selling over one million copies in Europe. The most successful songs from the album included the lead single, "Quand j'ai peur de tout" (number eleven in France; Silver certification) and the second single, "Je voudrais la connaître" (number nine in Belgium Wallonia nad number twenty in France). Another live album, Rendez-vous was issued in August 1998. It reached top ten in France and Belgium Wallonia, and was certified 2× Gold in France.

The fifth studio album, Le mot de passe was released on 14 May 1999. It peaked at number two in France and Belgium Wallonia, and reached top forty in other countries. Le mot de passe was certified Platinum in France, and Gold in Belgium and Switzerland. The lead single, "Ma liberté contre la tienne" reached top forty in France and Belgium Wallonia. The fourth live album, titled simply Live was issued in August 2000 and peaked at number five in France where it was certified 2× Gold. Rien ne s'arrête, Kaas' first greatest hits album from October 2001 peaked at number two in France, number three in Belgium Wallonia and number fourteen in Switzerland. It was also certified Platinum in France and Gold in Belgium and Switzerland.

Inspired by the film And Now... Ladies and Gentlemen, in which Kaas starred alongside Jeremy Irons, she has recorded her sixth studio album, Piano Bar. Released on 15 April 2002, Piano Bar reached top ten in the European Francophone countries, and top forty elsewhere, including New Zealand. It was certified Gold in France and Switzerland. Sexe fort, the seventh studio album was issued on 1 December 2003. It peaked inside top ten in the Francophone countries in Europe, and achieved 2× Gold certification in France and Gold certification in Switzerland. The following live album from January 2005, Toute la musique... reached top ten in France.

The next studio albums included: Kabaret (2008) and Kaas chante Piaf (2012), followed by two live albums: Kabaret: Live au Casino de Paris (2009) and Kaas chante Piaf à l'Olympia (2014), and two compilations: 19 par Patricia Kaas (2009) (released in Europe) and Mademoiselle n'a pas chanté que le blues (2011) (issued in Canada). Kabaret reached top ten in Switzerland, Belgium Wallonia, Finland and Greece, and Kaas chante Piaf peaked inside top ten in France and Switzerland.

Albums

Studio albums

Notes

Live albums

Notes

Compilation albums

Notes

Other albums

Notes

Singles

Notes

Home videos

Notes

References

Discographies of French artists
Pop music discographies